Epitoxis borguensis is a moth of the subfamily Arctiinae. It was described by George Hampson in 1901. It is found in Nigeria.

References

 

Endemic fauna of Nigeria
Arctiinae
Moths described in 1901